Scartella emarginata (maned blenny) is a species of combtooth blenny found in the Indian ocean. This species reaches a length of  SL.

References

emarginata
Fish described in 1861
Taxa named by Albert Günther